Ralph McElhaney (17 March 1874 – 5 December 1930) was a Scottish professional footballer who played as a forward and half back in the Scottish League and the Southern League.

Career statistics

Honours 
Brentford
Southern League Second Division: 1900–01

References

1874 births
1930 deaths
Scottish footballers
Association football forwards
Association football wing halves
Third Lanark A.C. players
Celtic F.C. players
Clyde F.C. players
Partick Thistle F.C. players
Scottish Football League players
Tottenham Hotspur F.C. players
Swindon Town F.C. players
Beith F.C. players
Southern Football League players
East Stirlingshire F.C. players
Dunipace F.C. players
Grays United F.C. players
Southall F.C. players
People from Govan